Aspects of philosopher, mathematician and social activist Bertrand Russell's views on society changed over nearly 80 years of prolific writing, beginning with his early work in 1896, until his death in February 1970.

Activism
Political and social activism occupied much of Russell's time for most of his long life, which makes his prodigious and seminal writing on a wide range of technical and non-technical subjects all the more remarkable.

Russell remained politically active to the end of his life, writing to and exhorting world leaders and lending his name to various causes. Some maintain that during his last few years he gave his youthful followers too much license and that they used his name for some outlandish purposes of which a more attentive Russell would not have approved. There is evidence to show that he became aware of this when he fired his private secretary, Ralph Schoenman, then a young firebrand of the radical left.

Pacifism, war, and nuclear weapons
Russell was originally a Liberal Imperialist but in 1901 converted to anti-imperialism, pacifism and a Pro-Boer standpoint with regards to the Second Boer War.

He resisted specific wars on the grounds that they were contrary to the interests of civilisation, and thus immoral. On the other hand, his 1915 article on "The Ethics of War," he defended wars of colonisation on the same utilitarian grounds: he felt conquest was justified if the side with the more advanced civilisation could put the land to better use.

Russell's activism against British participation in World War I led to fines, a loss of freedom of travel within Britain, and the non-renewal of his fellowship at Trinity College, Cambridge, and he was eventually sentenced to prison in 1918 on the tenuous grounds that he had interfered in British foreign policy – he had argued that British workers should be wary of the United States Army, for it had experience in strike-breaking. He was released after serving six months, but was still closely supervised until the end of the war. Russell contended that "the abolition of private ownership of land and capital is a necessary step toward any world in which the nations are to live at peace with one another".

In 1943 Russell called his stance towards warfare "relative political pacifism"—he held that war was always a great evil, but in some particularly extreme circumstances (such as when Adolf Hitler threatened to take over Europe) it might be a lesser of multiple evils. In the years leading to World War II, he supported the policy of appeasement; but by 1940 he acknowledged that to preserve democracy, Hitler had to be defeated. This same reluctant value compromise was shared by his acquaintance A.A. Milne.

Russell consistently opposed the continued existence of nuclear weapons ever since their first use. However, on 20 November 1948, in a public speech at Westminster School, addressing a gathering arranged by the New Commonwealth, Russell shocked some observers with comments that seemed to suggest a preemptive nuclear strike on the Soviet Union might be justified. Russell apparently argued that the threat of war between the United States and the Soviet Union would enable the United States to force the Soviet Union to accept the Baruch Plan for international atomic energy control. (Earlier in the year he had written in the same vein to Walter W. Marseille.) Russell felt this plan "had very great merits and showed considerable generosity, when it is remembered that America still had an unbroken nuclear monopoly." (Has Man a Future?, 1961).

Nicholas Griffin of McMaster University, in his book The Selected Letters of Bertrand Russell: The Public Years, 1914–1970, interpreted Russell's wording as advocating not the actual use of the atom bomb, but merely its diplomatic use as a massive source of leverage over the actions of the Soviets.

Griffin's interpretation was disputed by Nigel Lawson; the former British Chancellor, who was present at the speech. Lawson claims it was quite clear that Russell was advocating an actual first strike, a view that is consistent with that reported by Hermann Bondi in Bondi's autobiography (Science, Churchill and Me, 1990, p60)  recounting Russell's views from the time when Russell and Bondi were fellows of Trinity College in Cambridge. Whichever interpretation is correct, Russell later relented, instead arguing for mutual disarmament by the nuclear powers, possibly linked to some form of world government.

In 1955, Russell released the Russell-Einstein Manifesto, co-signed by Albert Einstein and nine other leading scientists and intellectuals, a document which led to the first of the Pugwash Conferences on Science and World Affairs in 1957. In 1957-58, Russell became the first president of the Campaign for Nuclear Disarmament, which advocated unilateral nuclear disarmament by Britain. He resigned two years later when the CND would not support civil disobedience, and formed the Committee of 100. In September 1961 he was imprisoned for a week under an act of 1361 for refusing to call off a huge ban-the-bomb demonstration at the Ministry of Defence organised by the Committee of 100. He served the sentence in the hospital of Brixton Prison.

During the Cuban Missile Crisis, Russell sent telegrams to US President John F. Kennedy, Soviet Premier Nikita Khrushchev, the UN Secretary-General U Thant and British Prime Minister Harold Macmillan. His telegrams were greatly critical of Kennedy, who he had already singled out earlier as "more dangerous than Hitler", and tolerant of Khrushchev. Khrushchev replied with a long letter, published by the Russian news agency ITAR-TASS, which was mainly addressed to Kennedy and the Western world.

Increasingly concerned about the potential danger to humanity arising from nuclear weapons and other scientific discoveries, he also joined with Einstein, Robert Oppenheimer, Joseph Rotblat and other eminent scientists of the day to establish the World Academy of Art and Science which was formally constituted in 1960.

The Bertrand Russell Peace Foundation and its publishing imprint Spokesman Books began work in 1963 to carry forward Russell's work for peace, human rights and social justice.

Russell criticised the official account of the assassination of John F. Kennedy in "16 Questions on the Assassination," 1964.

Korea and Vietnam
He began public opposition to US policy in Vietnam with a letter to The New York Times dated 28 March 1963. By the autumn of 1966, he had completed the manuscript War Crimes in Vietnam. Then, using the American justifications for the Nuremberg Trials, Russell, along with Jean-Paul Sartre, organised what he called an international War Crimes Tribunal, the Russell Tribunal.

Russell supported Korean nationalism, referring to North Koreans and South Koreans as "cousins".

Communism, anarchism and socialism
Russell was, prior to being a socialist, a Georgist.

In 1914 he wrote to Lady Ottoline Morrell saying "It is clear the Socialists are the hope of the world". Russell expressed support for guild socialism. He was also an admirer of Franklin Delano Roosevelt and Eduard Bernstein.

Russell expressed great hope in "the Communist experiment." However, when he visited the Soviet Union and met Vladimir Lenin in 1920, he was unimpressed with the system in place. On his return he wrote a critical tract, The Practice and Theory of Bolshevism. He was "infinitely unhappy in this atmosphere—stifled by its utilitarianism, its indifference to love and beauty and the life of impulse." Although critical of its implementation in Soviet Russia, he still believed "that Communism is necessary to the world." He believed Lenin to be similar to a religious zealot, cold and possessing "no love of liberty" and a kind of "latter-day Cromwell".

Later in his life, Russell completely denounced Marxism and communism, stating that: 

In the 1922 and 1923 general elections Russell stood as a Labour Party candidate in the Chelsea constituency, but only on the basis that he knew he was extremely unlikely to be elected in such a safe Conservative seat, and he was not on either occasion.

He was strongly critical of Joseph Stalin's regime, writing that Stalin was responsible for millions of deaths. Between 1945 and 1947, together with A. J. Ayer and George Orwell, he contributed a series of articles to Polemic, a short-lived British "Magazine of Philosophy, Psychology, and Aesthetics" edited by the ex-Communist Humphrey Slater.

Russell was a consistent enthusiast for democracy and world government, and he advocated the establishment of a democratic international government in some of the essays collected in In Praise of Idleness (1935), and also in Has Man a Future? (1961).

Russell wrote of Michael Bakunin that "we do not find in Bakunin's works a clear picture of the society at which he aimed, or any argument to prove that such a society could be stable." Russell did not believe that an anarchist society was "realizable" but that "it cannot be denied that Kropotkin presents it with extraordinary persuasiveness and charm."

Women's suffrage
As a young man, Russell was a member of the Liberal Party and wrote in favour of women's suffrage. In his 1910 pamphlet, Anti-Suffragist Anxieties, Russell wrote that some men opposed suffrage because they "fear that their liberty to act in ways that are injurious to women will be curtailed." In May 1907, Russell stood for Parliament as a woman's suffrage candidate in Wimbledon, but was not elected.

Sexuality
Russell wrote against Victorian notions of morality. Marriage and Morals (1929) expressed his opinion that sex between a man and woman who are not married to each other is not necessarily immoral if they truly love one another, and advocated "trial marriages" or "companionate marriage", formalised relationships whereby young people could legitimately have sexual intercourse without being expected to remain married in the long term or to have children (an idea first proposed by Judge Ben Lindsey). This was enough to raise vigorous protests and denunciations against him during his visit to the United States shortly after the book's publication. Russell was also one of the first intellectuals to advocate open sex education and widespread access to contraception. He also advocated easy divorce, but only if the marriage had produced no children – Russell's view was that parents should remain married but tolerant of each other's sexual infidelity, if they had children. This reflected his life at the time – his second wife Dora was openly having an affair, and would soon become pregnant by another man, but Russell was keen for their children John and Kate to have a "normal" family life.

Russell was also an active supporter of the Homosexual Law Reform Society, being one of the signatories of A.E. Dyson's 1958 letter to The Times calling for a change in the law regarding male homosexual practices, which were partly legalised in 1967, when Russell was still alive.

Race
As with his views on religion, which developed considerably throughout his long life, Russell's views on the matter of race did not remain fixed. By 1951, Russell was a vocal advocate of racial equality and intermarriage; he penned a chapter on "Racial Antagonism" in New Hopes for a Changing World (1951), which read:

Passages in some of his early writings support birth control. On 16 November 1922, for instance, he gave a lecture to the General Meeting of Dr. Marie Stopes's Society for Constructive Birth Control and Racial Progress on "Birth Control and International Relations," in which he described the importance of extending Western birth control worldwide; his remarks anticipated the population control movement of the 1960s and the role of the United Nations.

Another passage from early editions of his book Marriage and Morals (1929), which Russell later claimed to be referring only to environmental conditioning, and which he significantly modified in later editions, reads:

However, in 1932 he condemned the "unwarranted assumption" that "Negroes are congenitally inferior to white men" (Education and the Social Order, Chap. 3).

Responding in 1964 to a correspondent's inquiry, "Do you still consider the Negroes an inferior race, as you did when you wrote Marriage and Morals?", Russell replied:

Eugenics

Russell laid out his views about eugenics with a full chapter on the topic in his book Marriage and Morals. He expressed agreement with the basic idea, while criticizing specific views and positions eugenicists held (particularly a strong class bias). Russell accepted a forced sterilization policy for negative eugenics, but only that of "mental defectives", condemning some laws for being overly broad. He also cautioned that eugenics policies had to account for scientific evidence, such as not making claims that all criminal behavior had genetic causes when psychology indicated otherwise. In terms of positive eugenics, he felt that free education should be provided for only to the professional classes, based not on the merits of the children, but of the parents, so that children are not burdened with cramming and have more time to breed large families. Russell also acknowledge the difficulty of deciding what desirable traits are, and that tradeoffs can exist (e.g. to breed for strength might diminish intelligence). He also acknowledged that to practice eugenics would entail a radical disruption of the family, feeling that a select group from the population might be set apart solely to breed in the future. While finding this idea repugnant, he thought it might nonetheless be effective. Discussing "race" eugenics, he felt the prevalent racist views were largely an excuse for chauvinism, and dismissed concerns about white people being outbred by East Asians. He considered some peoples inferior due to "environmental conditioning". He felt that in the future people might well select sexual partners for procreation voluntarily due to eugenic considerations. Russell felt certain eugenics views would win out in the future and become law. He conceded that it was repugnant to people and a "scientific tyranny" could arise, but felt this would be better than religious tyranny.

Influence on society
Russell often characterised his moral and political writings as lying outside the scope of philosophy, but Russell's admirers and detractors are often more acquainted with his pronouncements on social and political matters, or what some (e.g., biographer Ray Monk) have called his "journalism," than they are with his technical, philosophical work. There is a marked tendency to conflate these matters, and to judge Russell the philosopher on what he himself would certainly consider to be his non-philosophical opinions. Russell often cautioned people to make this distinction. Beginning in the 1920s, Russell wrote frequently for The Nation on changing morals, nuclear disarmament and literature. In 1965, he wrote that the magazine "...has been one of the few voices which has been heard on behalf of individual liberty and social justice consistently throughout its existence."

Paul McCartney, a member of The Beatles, said that after he met with Russell at his house and discussed the Vietnam war with him, McCartney inspired John Lennon and the band to take an anti-war stance.

Further reading

Selected bibliography of Russell's books
This is a selected bibliography of Russell's books in English sorted by year of first publication.
 1896, German Social Democracy, London: Longmans, Green
 1897, An Essay on the Foundations of Geometry, Cambridge: At the University Press.
 1900, A Critical Exposition of the Philosophy of Leibniz, Cambridge: At the University Press.
 1905 On Denoting, Mind vol. 14, NS, Basil Blackwell
 1910–1913, Principia Mathematica (with Alfred North Whitehead), 3 vols., Cambridge: At the University Press.
 1912, The Problems of Philosophy, London: Williams and Norgate.
 1914, Our Knowledge of the External World as a Field for Scientific Method in Philosophy, Chicago and London: Open Court Publishing.
 1916, Principles of Social Reconstruction, London: George Allen & Unwin
 1916, Justice in War-time, Chicago: Open Court.
 1917, Political Ideals, New York: The Century Co.
 1918, Mysticism and Logic and Other Essays, London: Longmans, Green.
 1918, Proposed Roads to Freedom: Socialism, Anarchism, and Syndicalism, London: George Allen & Unwin.
 1919, Introduction to Mathematical Philosophy, London: George Allen & Unwin, ( for Routledge paperback) (Copy at Archive.org).
 1920, The Practice and Theory of Bolshevism, London: George Allen & Unwin
 1921, The Analysis of Mind, London: George Allen & Unwin.
 1922, The Problem of China, London: George Allen & Unwin.
 1923, The Prospects of Industrial Civilization (in collaboration with Dora Russell), London: George Allen & Unwin.
 1923, The ABC of Atoms, London: Kegan Paul, Trench, Trubner.
 1924, Icarus, or the Future of Science, London: Kegan Paul, Trench, Trubner.
 1925, The ABC of Relativity, London: Kegan Paul, Trench, Trubner.
 1925, What I Believe, London: Kegan Paul, Trench, Trubner.
 1926, On Education, Especially in Early Childhood, London: George Allen & Unwin.
 1927, The Analysis of Matter, London: Kegan Paul, Trench, Trubner.
 1927, Why I Am Not a Christian, London: Watts.
 1927, Selected Papers of Bertrand Russell, New York: Modern Library.
 1928, Sceptical Essays, London: George Allen & Unwin.
 1929, Marriage and Morals, London: George Allen & Unwin.
 1930, The Conquest of Happiness, London: George Allen & Unwin.
 1931, The Scientific Outlook, London: George Allen & Unwin.
 1932, Education and the Social Order, London: George Allen & Unwin.
 1934, Freedom and Organization, 1814–1914, London: George Allen & Unwin.
 1935, In Praise of Idleness, London: George Allen & Unwin.
 1935, Religion and Science, London: Thornton Butterworth.
 1936, Which Way to Peace?, London: Jonathan Cape.
 1937, The Amberley Papers: The Letters and Diaries of Lord and Lady Amberley (with Patricia Russell), 2 vols., London: Leonard & Virginia Woolf at the Hogarth Press.
 1938, Power: A New Social Analysis, London: George Allen & Unwin.
 1940, An Inquiry into Meaning and Truth, New York: W. W. Norton & Company.
 1946, A History of Western Philosophy and Its Connection with Political and Social Circumstances from the Earliest Times to the Present Day, New York: Simon and Schuster.
 1948, Human Knowledge: Its Scope and Limits, London: George Allen & Unwin.
 1949, Authority and the Individual, London: George Allen & Unwin.
 1950, Unpopular Essays, London: George Allen & Unwin.
 1951, New Hopes for a Changing World, London: George Allen & Unwin.
 1952, The Impact of Science on Society, London: George Allen & Unwin.
 1953, Satan in the Suburbs and Other Stories, London: George Allen & Unwin.
 1954, Human Society in Ethics and Politics, London: George Allen & Unwin.
 1954, Nightmares of Eminent Persons and Other Stories, London: George Allen & Unwin.
 1956, Portraits from Memory and Other Essays, London: George Allen & Unwin.
 1956, Logic and Knowledge: Essays 1901–1950 (edited by Robert C. Marsh), London: George Allen & Unwin.
 1957, Why I Am Not A Christian and Other Essays on Religion and Related Subjects (edited by Paul Edwards), London: George Allen & Unwin.
 1958, Understanding History and Other Essays, New York: Philosophical Library.
 1959, Common Sense and Nuclear Warfare, London: George Allen & Unwin.
 1959, My Philosophical Development, London: George Allen & Unwin.
 1959, Wisdom of the West ("editor", Paul Foulkes), London: Macdonald.
 1960, Bertrand Russell Speaks His Mind, Cleveland and New York: World Publishing Company.
 1961, Fact and Fiction, London: George Allen & Unwin.
 1961, Has Man a Future?, London: George Allen & Unwin.
 1963, Essays in Skepticism, New York: Philosophical Library.
 1963, Unarmed Victory, London: George Allen & Unwin.
 1965, On the Philosophy of Science (edited by Charles A. Fritz, Jr.), Indianapolis: The Bobbs-Merrill Company.
 1967, Russell's Peace Appeals (edited by Tsutomu Makino and Kazuteru Hitaka), Japan: Eichosha's New Current Books.
 1967, War Crimes in Vietnam, London: George Allen & Unwin.
 1967–1969, The Autobiography of Bertrand Russell, 3 vols., London: George Allen & Unwin.
 1969, Dear Bertrand Russell… A Selection of his Correspondence with the General Public 1950–1968 (edited by Barry Feinberg and Ronald Kasrils), London: George Allen and Unwin.

Russell also wrote many pamphlets, introductions, articles and letters to the editor. His works also can be found in a number of anthologies and collections, including The Collected Papers of Bertrand Russell, which McMaster University began publishing in 1983. The Russell Archives at McMaster University also have more than 30,000 letters that he wrote.

Biographical books
 Bertrand Russell: Philosopher and Humanist, by John Lewis (1968)
 Bertrand Russell and His World, by Ronald W. Clark (1981)

Notes

References
 Bertrand Russell. 1967–1969, The Autobiography of Bertrand Russell, 3 volumes, London: George Allen & Unwin.
 Wallechinsky, David & Irving Wallace. 1975–1981, "Famous Marriages Bertrand Russell & Alla Pearsall Smith, Part 1" & "Part 3", on "Alys" Pearsall Smith, webpage content from The People's Almanac, webpages: Part 1 & Part 3 (accessed 2008-11-08).

External links

Writings available online
 
Works by or about Bertrand Russell at Internet Archive
Works by Bertrand Russell at Open Library

Audio

 Works by Bertrand Russell at LibriVox (public domain audiobooks)
 Bertrand Russell Audio Archive
 In Praise of Idleness free mp3 recitation of Russell's essay of the same name, from the Audio Anarchy project

Other

 
 Russell Photo Gallery
 Photographs at the National Portrait Gallery
 
 The Bertrand Russell Archives
The Bertrand Russell Society
Resource list
 The First Reith Lecture given by Russell (Real Audio)
 Lecture about 1905, the philosophical landscale of Einstein in which Russell was central

Society